Hunt Music is a compilation album by American rock musician Ted Nugent. The album did not see a large release but is still available on Internet sites. The second disc contains bonus tracks recorded by Ted Nugent. "I Just Wanna Go Hunting" had been unreleased.

Track listing

Disc 1 
 "Spirit of the Wild"
 "Fred Bear Jam - Live Nugent"
 "Sunrize" (instrumental)
 "Tooth Fang & Claw"
 "Fred Bear - The American Hunter's Theme Song"
 "Earthtones"
 "I Just Wanna Go Hunting"
 "Sunrize" (narrated)
 "KLSTRBK"
 "My Bow & Arrow"
 "Great White Buffalo"

 Rob Grange appears on "Great White Buffalo" and "Tooth, Fang and Claw"

Disc 2 
 "Physics of Spirituality Part One"
 "Physics of Spirituality Part Two"
 "Hibernation"

Ted Nugent albums
2004 compilation albums